Natee Thongsookkaew (Thai นที ทองสุขแก้ว; born 8 December 1966 in Uttaradit) is a Thai retired footballer. He captained the Thailand national team from 1996 to 1998.

International goals

External links

1966 births
Living people
Natee Thongsookkaew
Natee Thongsookkaew
1992 AFC Asian Cup players
1996 AFC Asian Cup players
Natee Thongsookkaew
Gamba Osaka players
Natee Thongsookkaew
Footballers at the 1990 Asian Games
Footballers at the 1998 Asian Games
Natee Thongsookkaew
Natee Thongsookkaew
Southeast Asian Games medalists in football
Association football central defenders
Competitors at the 1991 Southeast Asian Games
Competitors at the 1993 Southeast Asian Games
Competitors at the 1995 Southeast Asian Games
Competitors at the 1997 Southeast Asian Games
Natee Thongsookkaew
Thai expatriate sportspeople in Japan
Natee Thongsookkaew